Márta Weöres (born 7 August 1976) is a Hungarian sailor. She competed in the women's 470 event at the 2004 Summer Olympics.

References

External links
 

1976 births
Living people
Hungarian female sailors (sport)
Olympic sailors of Hungary
Sailors at the 2004 Summer Olympics – 470
Sportspeople from Budapest